Gollejeh (also Romanized as Gollejeh and Goljeh; also known as Kulidzha and Kulija) is a village in Howmeh Rural District, in the Central District of Abhar County, Zanjan Province, Iran. At the 2006 census, its population was 68, in 19 families.

References 

Populated places in Abhar County